The Australian Academy of the Humanities was established by Royal Charter in 1969 to advance scholarship and public interest in the humanities in Australia. It operates as an independent not-for-profit organisation partly funded by the Australian government.

History 
The Australian Academy of the Humanities was established by Royal Charter in 1969. Its antecedent was the Australian Humanities Research Council (AHRC), which was convened informally in 1954 through the combined efforts of Dr Brian R. Elliott and Professor A. N. Jeffares, who organised preliminary meetings in Melbourne of delegates drawn from the Faculties of Arts in Australian universities. The AHRC was a positive force in education and scholarship, and its activities gradually evolved, especially in its support for national projects in the humanities. Recognition among the AHRC executive of the changing functions of the Council led in 1967 to the proposal of establishing an Academy. Royal consent was granted to the petition on 25 June 1969, and Letters Patent issued, constituting the Academy from that date. The Academy's Foundation Fellows were the members the AHRC.

The highest distinction in scholarship in the humanities was required of candidates for election to the Fellowship of the Australian Academy of the Humanities. The first intake comprising sixteen Fellows (including Geoffrey Blainey, Kenneth Inglis, John Mulvaney, David Monro, Franz Philipp, Saiyid Rizvi, Oskar Spate and Judith Wright) and one Honorary Fellow (J. C. Beaglehole) were elected by the fifty-one Foundation Fellows at a Special General Meeting on 20–21 September 1969. Annual elections have taken place since that time.

For an account of the debates and efforts that led to the establishment of the Academy, see Graeme Davison FAHA's article in the inaugural edition of Humanities Australia: 'Phoenix Rising: The Academy and the Humanities in 1969'.

Governance 
The Academy is governed by a Council of leaders in the humanities, elected from among its Fellows, who provide strategic direction, policy guidance, and management oversight. The Council meets four times a year. A Canberra-based Secretariat is responsible for the day-to-day running of the Academy. In February 2023 Inga Davis succeeded Christina Parolin as executive director.

Council in 2020 
President: Professor Lesley Head FASSA FAHA (elected November 2020)

Vice-President & Honorary Secretary: Professor Emerita Elizabeth Minchin FAHA

Vice-President & International Secretary: Professor Louise Edwards FASSA FHKAH FAHA

Honorary Treasurer: Emeritus Professor Richard Waterhouse FRSN FASSA FAHA

Editor: Emeritus Professor Graham Tulloch FAHA

Immediate Past President: Professor Joy Damousi FASSA FAHA

Members: Professor Duncan Ivison FRSN FAHA, Professor Jennifer Milam FAHA, Distinguished Professor Ingrid Piller FAHA, Distinguished Professor Julian Thomas FAHA and Distinguished Professor Sean Ulm FSA MAACAI FAHA

Fellowship 
The Academy comprises a Fellowship of over 640 of the most influential humanities researchers and practitioners in, or associated, with Australia. The post-nominal abbreviation for a Fellow of the Academy is FAHA.

The following eleven disciplines serve as the Fellowship's electoral sections:
Archaeology
Asian Studies
Classical Studies
Cultural and Communication Studies
English
European Languages and Cultures
History
Linguistics
Philosophy and the History of Ideas
Religion
The Arts

Election to the Academy takes place at the Annual general meeting, following nomination by Council on the advice of the eleven electoral sections.

Foundation Fellows 
At the date of the grant of the Royal Charter establishing the Australian Academy of the Humanities in 1969, there were 51 Members of the AHRC who became the Foundation Fellows of the new Academy.

An asterisk denotes a Fellow who was also a Foundation Member of the AHRC.

 David Malet ARMSTRONG
 James Johnston AUCHMUTY*
 Arthur Llewellyn BASHAM
 Flora Marjorie BASSETT
 John BOWMAN
 Ernest BRAMSTED
 Joseph Terence BURKE*
 Alexander CAMBITOGLOU
 Alan Rowland CHISHOLM*
 Charles Manning Hope CLARK
 Raymond Maxwell CRAWFORD*
 William CULICAN
 William Allan EDWARDS*
 Brian ELLIOTT
 Ralph ELLIOTT
 Ralph Barstow FARRELL*
 Charles Patrick FITZGERALD
 Kathleen Elizabeth FITZPATRICK*
 Alexander Boyce GIBSON*
 Gordon GREENWOOD*
 (William) Keith HANCOCK
 Ursula HOFF
 Alec Derwent HOPE*
 Harold Arthur Kinross HUNT*
 John Andrew LA NAUZE*
 James R. LAWLER*
 Ts'un-yan LIU
 Ian Ramsey MAXWELL*
 Alexander George MITCHELL*
 Harold James OLIVER
 John Arthur PASSMORE
 Douglas Henry PIKE
 (Archibald) Grenfell PRICE*
 Paul REDDING
 George Federick Elliot RUDÉ
 George Harrison RUSSELL
 Richard Herbert SAMUEL*
 Alan George Lewers SHAW
 George Pelham SHIPP*
 Keith Val SINCLAIR
 John Jamieson Carswell SMART
 Jacob SMIT
 Bernard William SMITH
 Alan Ker STOUT*
 Theodor George Henry STREHLOW
 Léon TAUMAN*
 Arthur Dale TRENDALL*
 Louis Augustus TRIEBEL*
 Otto Berkelbach VAN DER SPRENKEL
 John Manning WARD
 Francis James WEST
 Gerald Alfred WILKES

Honorary Foundation Fellows 

 Claude Thomas BISSELL
 Herbert Cole COOMBS
 Alexander Norman JEFFARES
 John McMANNERS
 Robert (Gordon) MENZIES
 Kenneth Baillieu MYER
 Harold (Leslie) WHITE

Other academies 
There are three other Learned Academies in Australia: the Australian Academy of Science (AAS), the Academy of the Social Sciences in Australia (ASSA), and the Australian Academy of Technological Sciences and Engineering (ATSE). These four academies co-operate through the Australian Council of Learned Academies (ACOLA), formed in 2010. In addition to this, the four Academies convene the biennial National Scholarly Communication Forum "to disseminate information changes to the context and structures of scholarly communication in Australia, and to make recommendations on what a broad spectrum of participants see as the best developmental policies".

References

Sources
 The Australian Academy of the Humanities Royal Charter and By-Laws

Educational institutions established in 1969
Humanities
Organisations based in Australia with royal patronage
Australian National Academies
1969 establishments in Australia

National academies of arts and humanities